Sea Horses is a 1926 American silent drama film directed by Allan Dwan and written by Becky Gardiner, James Shelley Hamilton, and Francis Brett Young. The film stars Jack Holt, Florence Vidor, William Powell, George Bancroft, Mack Swain, Frank Campeau, and Allan Simpson. The film was released on February 22, 1926, by Paramount Pictures. It is based on the 1925 novel of the same title by British writer Francis Brett Young.

Plot
As described in a film magazine review, a young American captain aids a beautiful young English woman to find her Italian husband, who has abandoned her and her child, in an evil African port. Her efforts at reconciliation refused, she returns to the captain, who loves her. The child is kidnaped by the father. There is a terrific fight. The captain and the mother and child escape, and the dissolute husband is wiped out in a tropical storm.

Cast

Preservation
With no prints of Sea Horses located in any film archives, it is a lost film.

References

External links

 
 

1926 films
1920s English-language films
Silent American drama films
1926 drama films
Paramount Pictures films
Films directed by Allan Dwan
American black-and-white films
Lost American films
American silent feature films
Films shot at Astoria Studios
1926 lost films
Lost drama films
Films based on British novels
1920s American films